Xaysetha District may refer to:

 Saysetha District, a district in Attapeu Province in Laos
 Xaysetha District (Vientiane), a district in Vientiane Prefecture in Laos